Real World/Road Rules Challenge: The Gauntlet is the 7th season of the MTV reality game show, The Challenge (at the time known as Real World/Road Rules Challenge). The season is directly subsequent to Battle of the Sexes. The Gauntlet featured 28 castmates competing in missions with an immunity life-saver awarded to the best individual performer. Each team would then select a player from their team to go into the Gauntlet elimination challenge.  It was hosted by Jonny Moseley. This season was nominated for a GLAAD Media Award for outstanding reality program.

Filming was originally planned to began in July 2003 in Middletown, RI, but in June a local judge blocked it at request of local residents who thought it would be "materially disruptive". The show instead ended up being filmed in Telluride, CO, and finished filming in August 2003. A casting special, Real World/Road Rules Corral: A Guide To The Gauntlet was aired on September 22, 2003. The season premiered one week later on September 29, 2003, and concluded on January 26, 2004, with the Reunion special. This is the first edition of the Gauntlet series, with The Gauntlet 2 following in 2005–2006 and The Gauntlet III following in 2008.

Contestants

Gameplay

Gauntlet games
Ride 'Em Cowboy: Players have to hold on to a mechanical bull with just one hand. Whoever falls off first loses.
Played 3 Times: Katie vs. Montana, Rachel B. vs. Sarah, Cara vs. Theo G.
Dead Man's Drop: Players are suspended 10 feet into the air on a pole. They have to hold on to the pole by hanging upside down with their legs.
Played 4 Times: David vs. Sarah, Coral vs. Tina, Matt vs. Sarah, Irulan vs. Sarah
Hangman: Similar to Dead Man's Drop, players are still suspended 10 feet into the air, only they hang on the pole with their hands and are positioned right side up.
Played 1 Time: Katie vs. Rachel B.
Perfect Fit: Players first must jump into a pool and pick up their respective puzzle pieces (which are scattered about the pool). The first player to solve the puzzle wins.
Played 3 Times: Steve vs. Tonya, Steve vs. Trishelle, Sarah vs. Trishelle
Knock Your Block Off: Players joust on a beam right above a pool. Whoever gets knocked off first loses.
Played 2 Times: Cara vs. Elka, Abram vs. Mike
Pole Climb: Players climb a 10-foot pole. Whoever gets to the top first pulls a lever that drops the opponent's pole into the pool.
Played 1 Time: Alton vs. Laterrian

Game summary

Bank Accounts
Real World - $60,000
$12,000 each
Road Rules - $230,000
$25,555 each

Gauntlet progress

Teams
 The contestant is on the Real World team
 The contestant is on the Road Rules team
Competition
 The contestant won the final challenge
 The contestant lost the final challenge
 The contestant won the Freshlook Eyesaver Winner and was safe from the Gauntlet
 The contestant was not selected to go into the Gauntlet
 The contestant won the Gauntlet
 The contestant lost the Gauntlet and was eliminated
 The team was removed from the competition due to illness

Episodes

After filming
Instead of  a reunion special,  Battle Scars - From the Gauntlet to the Inferno, a follow-up special  aired on January 26, 2004 introducing the next season, Real World/Road Rules Challenge: The Inferno with commentary by few of this season's contestants.

Notes

References

External links

MTV's official Road Rules website
MTV's official Real World website

Gauntlet
2003 American television seasons
2004 American television seasons
Television shows set in Colorado
Television shows filmed in Colorado